The Maples is a historic farmstead located at Cazenovia in Madison County, New York.  The frame farmhouse was built about 1835 and is a -story, rectangular frame residence in the Greek Revival style. It features a gable roof and monumental classical portico of fluted Doric order columns.  Also on the property are two historic barns.

It was added to the National Register of Historic Places in 1987.

References

Houses on the National Register of Historic Places in New York (state)
Houses completed in 1835
Houses in Madison County, New York
National Register of Historic Places in Cazenovia, New York